The Christmas Present is the 12th studio album by British singer-songwriter Robbie Williams, and his first studio album since 2016's The Heavy Entertainment Show. It was released on 22 November 2019, and features guest appearances from Tyson Fury, Rod Stewart, Jamie Cullum, Helene Fischer and Bryan Adams. Williams performed a pair of concerts dubbed "The Robbie Williams Christmas Party" at the SSE Arena on 16 and 17 December 2019 in promotion of the album.

Background
In a Q&A with BBC Radio 2 in December 2012, Williams was asked if he would consider doing a Christmas album. "You bet", Williams stated. "I used to hate Christmas, but my wife Ayda has instilled me with Christmas spirit. It used to be a time of year that I didn't care too much for, but she loves it, loves it like a child, and because of that, I now love it, it's a very very special time of the year, and because of that, yes I'm willing to do a Christmas album, and I will do one at one point".

Williams began recording the album in June 2019, just before the final leg of his Wynn Las Vegas residency, and concluded in Vancouver in October 2019. Williams joked that he was going to call the album Achtung Bublé, a play on words of the U2 album "Achtung Baby", and in reference to Michael Bublé's "monopoly" on the Christmas music market, which he said "must end now". Williams was asked in an interview whether or not there were any plans for Bublé to sing on the album and he answered: "He sang with me on an album of mine called Swings Both Ways. You sort of get it in your head that you can only use that token once. I might be wrong. I should have got him involved.">

In an interview with Smooth FM, Williams stated: "I wrote 50 songs for the Christmas Present record. And you can’t write 50 songs in one month because it’s Christmas and you feel Christmassy, so you have to do it when the fancy takes you."

Williams initially aspired to cover "Fairytale of New York" as a duet with Britney Spears which the latter declined due to being on hiatus.

Critical reception

The Christmas Present received mixed reviews from music critics. At Metacritic, which assigns a normalised rating out of 100 to reviews from mainstream critics, the album has an average score of 52 based on 4 reviews, indicating "mixed or average reviews".

Jordan Bassett of NME rated the album 3/5 stars, writing: "The original compositions are richer than the covers. The galloping 'Darkest Night' opens with the fabulous line "December in London / Think I’ve just been made redundant" and the optimistic 'New Year's Day' borrows quite liberally from George Michael's 'Freedom' on a jubilant bridge where Robbie and a gospel choir rapturously exclaim, "Oh! It’s an energy! Oh! The memories!""

The song "Bad Sharon", featuring Tyson Fury on guest vocals, was called a "favourite" to be the UK Christmas number one.

Singles 
"Time for Change" was released as the album's official lead single on 22 November 2019.

The album's second single, "Can't Stop Christmas", was released on 20 November 2020.

Commercial performance
The Christmas Present opened at number two on the UK Albums Chart, behind Coldplay's Everyday Life. The album sold 67,000 copies in the UK during its first week, the same amount as Williams' previous album The Heavy Entertainment Show (2016). Despite not getting to number one on the charts, Williams' had the fastest selling cassette release in over two decades. The Christmas Present sold over 10,000 cassettes in its first seven days of release. Halfway through its second week, Williams' album climbed to number one, outselling Rod Stewart's album You're in My Heart by 5,000 copies and becoming Williams' 13th number one, tying Elvis Presley for the most UK number one albums. In its second week, 57,000 copies had been sold. Williams now ties Presley for the most #1's in a solo career, and has 17 number one albums when including his Take That career.

The Christmas Present opened at number two on the Australian music chart, behind Coldplay's Everyday Life. The following week, The Christmas Present became Williams' first number one album in Australia since Reality Killed the Video Star 10 years prior.

Track listing

Charts

Weekly charts

Year-end charts

Certifications

References

2019 Christmas albums
Christmas albums by English artists
Columbia Records Christmas albums
Robbie Williams albums